Madison is a city located primarily in Madison County, near the northern border of the U.S. state of Alabama. Madison extends west into neighboring Limestone County. The city is included in the Huntsville Metropolitan Area, the second-largest in the state, and is also included in the merged Huntsville-Decatur Combined Statistical Area. As of the 2020 census, the population of the city was 56,933, up from 42,938 at the 2010 census. Madison is bordered by Huntsville on nearly all sides with some small unincorporated lands within and around Madison in Madison and Limestone Counties.

Madison was mostly a small city for many years until Redstone Arsenal was established nearby, which attracted many people to the area for jobs. This rapidly increased the city's population and stimulated economic growth. Many of Madison's residents work in Research Park or the Redstone Arsenal. Madison has been one of the fastest-growing cities in Alabama as well as one of the wealthiest in the state. In 2021 census estimates, Madison was the 9th largest city in Alabama and the second largest city in North Alabama following only nearby Huntsville.

History

The area was occupied historically by the Koasati (also known as Coushatta), a Muskogean-speaking people. Before them were thousands of years of indigenous cultures.

Madison's first European-American resident was John Cartwright, who settled in the area in 1818. The city was originally known as "Madison Station", as it developed in the 1850s around a stop of the Memphis & Charleston Railroad. Textile mills were built in the area in the late 19th century for processing and manufacture of cotton products.

Madison was the site of a battle in the American Civil War. On May 17, 1864, Col. Josiah Patterson's 5th Alabama Cavalry, supported by Col. James H. Stuart's cavalry battalion and a section of horse artillery, drove Col. Adam G. Gorgas's 13th Illinois Infantry Regiment from the city. Patterson's men captured the 13th Illinois Regiment's wagon train, taking 66 prisoners. They also burned Union supplies and tore up the railroad tracks before retreating. Portions of the 5th Ohio Cavalry, the 59th Indiana Infantry, and the 5th Iowa Infantry were sent in pursuit from Huntsville. They skirmished with Patterson's rear guard that evening at Fletcher's Ferry on the Tennessee River south of Madison.

The town was incorporated in 1869. From 1880 to 1950, rural Madison had a population of some 400-500 residents.

In the World War II and postwar period, military and NASA operations were moved to Huntsville, stimulating an increase in population in the region. Subsidized highways stimulated suburbanization, attracting residents to outlying areas where new homes were built. By 1980, Madison's population was 4,057. In the late 20th century, Madison's population increased rapidly as it developed as a suburb of Huntsville. In 1986, Madison voters overwhelmingly voted to remain independent by not merging with Huntsville. By 2010 its population had grown to 42,938, and over the following ten years it grew to a population of 56,933.

Geography

Madison is located at  (34.715065, -86.739644), primarily within Madison County, while extending west into Limestone County.

Demographics

2020 census

As of the 2020 United States census, there were 56,933 people, 18,825 households, and 13,540 families residing in the city.

2010 census
As of the US Census of 2010, 42,938 people were residing in the city, an increase of 44.6% from the 29,329 residing there in 2000.  The population consisted of 16,111 households and 11,770 families.  The average household size was 2.65, while the average family size was 3.16.  30.8% of the population was age 19 or younger, 61.0% was 20–64, and 8.2% was 65 or older.  The median age was 37.0 years.  The population was 49.3% male and 50.7% female.

The racial makeup of the city was 74.0% White, 14.6% Black or African American, 0.5% Native American, 7.0% Asian, 0.1% Pacific Islander, 1.3% from other races, and 2.6% from two or more races. 4.6% of the population were Hispanic or Latino of any race.

According to the Madison Chamber of Commerce, Madison was the fastest-growing city in Alabama as of 2010.

Economy

Personal income
The median income for a household in the city was $92,136, and the median income for a family was $111,217. The per capita income for the city was $41,490. About 3.9% of families and 4.9% of the population were below the poverty line, including 5.9% of those under age 18 and 3.4% of those age 65 or over.

Industry
Madison's largest employer is Intergraph, a computer software company. It is a subsidiary of Hexagon, a Swedish software company that bought Intergraph in 2008 and invested in the city and area to improve it. Currently, they are working on a streetlight maintenance program for Madison. Thousands of Madison residents commute to jobs at Cummings Research Park and Redstone Arsenal in nearby Huntsville, about 12 miles away. The high-tech and academic positions in the area have attracted numerous highly educated, professional residents.

Education
The Madison City School System, formed in 1998, serves over 10,000 students from the city of Madison and town of Triana.  It has consistently been rated as one of the best school systems in the state. The current superintendent is Dr. Ed Nichols. Nationally, it ranks in the top 5 best school systems.

As of 2012, the school system has seven elementary schools serving grades K-5 (Columbia Elementary School, Heritage Elementary School, Horizon Elementary School, Madison Elementary School, Mill Creek Elementary School, Rainbow Elementary School, and Midtown Elementary School), two middle schools serving grades 6-8 (Discovery Middle School, Liberty Middle School), and two high schools serving grades 9-12 (Bob Jones High School and James Clemens High School). There was formerly an additional elementary school, West Madison Elementary; however, it is permanently closed and planned to be adapted as a pre-K center. Madison Elementary, built about 1936, is the oldest school in the system.

In 2019, Madison residents approved a voluntary property tax increase in order to fund school growth and expansion. These funds were used to build Midtown Elementary School (completed in 2020)  and will also be used to construct Journey Middle School.

Media
The Madison Record and the Madison County Record have been newspapers for the city since 1967. The Madison Weekly News was another local newspaper.

Infrastructure

Roads
Madison is served by Interstate 565, US 72 (University Drive), and Madison Boulevard (Alabama State Route 20, and Alt. US 72) and Gillespie Road, as main routes for east–west traffic.  Slaughter Road, Hughes Road, Wall Triana Highway, and County Line Road serve as main north–south roads in the city.

Rail and airline
The Norfolk Southern railway has the main line and a spur running through Madison. The Port of Huntsville, an intermodal center that includes Huntsville International Airport and a rail cargo center, is located just south of the city.

Culture and entertainment

Sports
The Rocket City Trash Pandas (formerly Mobile BayBears) is a Double A Southern League affiliate of the Los Angeles Angels that moved from Mobile, Alabama to Madison. The team was to begin play in Madison at Toyota Field beginning in April 2020, but coronavirus concerns delayed the team's debut until May 11, 2021.

Parks and greenways 
The City of Madison has several greenways and parks within city limits.

Madison is working with the nearby cities of Huntsville and Decatur to create a 70-mile bicycling and walking trail.

Notable people
Mike Ball, politician and member of the Alabama House of Representatives
Grant Dayton, Major League baseball pitcher
Lewie Hardage, American football player and coach, baseball coach
Robert Hoffman, actor, dancer, and choreographer
Bill Holtzclaw, politician and Republican member of the Alabama State Senate
Kerron Johnson, professional basketball player
Kerryon Johnson, professional football player free agent
Walter Jones, former offensive lineman at Florida State and an all-pro at the Seattle Seahawks
Chip Lindsey, college football coach for Troy University
Reggie Ragland, American football linebacker
 Levi Randolph (born 1992), basketball player for Hapoel Jerusalem of the Israeli Basketball Premier League

References

External links

Madison Chamber of Commerce site
Find More Madison site

Cities in Alabama
Cities in Madison County, Alabama
Cities in Limestone County, Alabama
1818 establishments in Alabama Territory
Populated places established in 1818
Huntsville-Decatur, AL Combined Statistical Area